The Swedish Trotting Derby (Swedish: Svenskt Travderby) is an annual national Group One harness event for trotters that is held at Jägersro Racetrack in Malmö, Sweden. It is by many considered the most prestigious Swedish event for 4-year-old racing horses.
The purse in the 2010 final was ≈US$442,000 (SEK 3,200,000), of which the winner, Joke Face, won half.

Location
Through the years, the host of the Derby final has at times annually been Jägersro, but at times, the hostesship has altered between Jägersro, Solvalla and Åby. Since 1966, the final event has been held at Jägersro Racetrack every year.

 1928 - 1932 Jägersro
 1933 - 1954 Jägersro or Solvalla
 1954 - 1965 Jägersro, Åby or Solvalla
 1966 - Jägersro

Entering the event
To enter the Swedish Trotting Derby, a horse owner is obliged to make four payments, the last approximately seven months before the final is held. In total, these payments consist of ≈US$523 (SEK4,375) as of 2009. In addition to these costs, a supplementary fee of ≈US$761 (SEK6,360) is paid to enter the elimination races 12 days before the final.

Racing conditions

Distance
From the start in 1928 until 1982, the distance of the Derby was in the interval 3,000-3,200 meters.

Starting method
The first 32 Derby finals, was started by using volt start. In 1960, auto start was introduced. Since then, a motorized starting gate has been used every year, with exceptions for 1962, 1969 and 1970.

Past winners

Drivers with most wins
 11 - Sören Nordin
 9 - Gunnar Nordin
 7 - Stig H. Johansson 
 5 - Gösta Nordin
 3 - Robert Bergh

Trainers with most wins
 11 - Sören Nordin
 9 - Gunnar Nordin
 7 - Stig H. Johansson
 5 - Gösta Nordin
 3 - Robert Bergh

Sires with at least two winning offsprings
 3 - Scotch Nibs (Pecka Trickson, Guy Nibs, Pom Chips)
 3 - Locomotive (Codex, Smaragd, Locomite)
 3 - Earl's Mr Will (Isa Will, Lola Will, Willburn)
 3 - Bulwark (Hetty, Presidenten, Architect)
 2 - Viking Kronos (Maharajah, Joke Face)
 2 - Alf Palema (Gazza Degato, Colombian Necktie)
 2 - Crowntron (Sans Rival, Queen L.)
 2 - Count's Pride (Jet Ribb, Gaston Pride)
 2 - Tibur (Mustard, Big Spender)
 2 - Sandy Flash (Sassa Hanover, Belle Day)
 2 - Tulipan (Fakir, Lorry)
 2 - Peter Pogue (Petersdotter, Peter Spjuver)
 2 - Dreamer Boy (Ibrahim Pascha, Karina S.)

Winning stallions that have also sired winners
 Björn (1968), sire of May Björn (1979)
 Gay Noon (1953), sire of Gavin (1965)

Winner with lowest odds
 Winning odds: 1.14 - Peter Spjuver (1931)

Winner with highest odds
 Winning odds: 74.36 - Segerstorp Comet (1970)

Fastest winners

2,640 meters auto start
 1:12.0 (km rate) - Who's Who (2018)

3,000-3,200 meters auto start
 1:18.9 (km rate) - Mustard (1980)

3,000-3,200 meters volt start
 1:22.2 (km rate) - Galint (1969)

All winners of the Swedish Trotting Derby

See also
 List of Scandinavian harness horse races

References

Harness races in Sweden